Zhu Yujian (1602 – 6 October 1646), nickname Changshou (長壽), originally the Prince of Tang, later reigned as the Longwu Emperor of the Southern Ming from 18 August 1645, when he was enthroned in Fuzhou, to 6 October 1646, when he was captured and executed by a contingent of the Qing army. He was an eighth generation descendant of Zhu Jing, Prince Ding of Tang, who was the 23rd son of Ming founder Zhu Yuanzhang (Hongwu Emperor).

Early life
Before ascending to the throne, he followed his father as the Prince of Tang, their fief being situated in Nanyang prefecture, in Henan province. In 1636, he was stripped of his title by the Chongzhen Emperor and put under house arrest in Fengyang. His former title was transferred to his younger brother Zhu Yumo. In 1641, the Zhu Yumo committed suicide when Li Zicheng invaded Nanyang. After the death of the Chongzhen Emperor 1644, his successor on the Ming throne, the Hongguang Emperor, released the Prince of Tang from his arrest.

Reign
When Qing forces captured Nanjing in June 1645, he fled to Hangzhou. However, when Hangzhou fell to the Qing on 6 July 1645, the Prince of Tang managed to escape by land to the southeastern province of Fujian.

In August of the same year, at the behest of several high officials, he ascended to the Ming throne in Fuzhou, taking the reign title "Longwu" (隆武; pinyin: Lóngwǔ). His era name means "plentiful and martial". After a promising start, Fujian's geographical position on the margin of the empire, cut off from the heartland by several mountain ranges, as well as his lack of effective troops and the failure on part of the officialdom to find a united stance doomed the Longwu government. When Qing forces invaded Fujian in the late summer of 1646, Zheng Zhilong, the emperor's strongest ally, surrendered while his son Zheng Chenggong (the famous Koxinga) retreated to the sea.

The Prince of Tang was left with a dwindling court. On 6 October 1646, he was captured and immediately executed.

Personality
Against the Ming policy of keeping imperial princes out of politics, the Prince of Tang early on showed interest in the government of the empire and strove for a larger role of the princes in it. His initiatives had brought him under house arrest during the reign of the Chongzhen Emperor, but his knowledge of history and of Ming institutions, paired with a diligent personality, made him take his imperial role seriously.

Zhu Yujian is said to have had a very close relationship with his wife, who had shared his hardship when he was incarcerated. Contrary to Chinese custom, he steadfastly declined to take any concubines.

Family
Consorts and Issue: 
 Empress Xiaoyixiang, of the Zeng clan (孝毅襄皇后 曾氏; d. 1646)
 Zhu Linyuan, Crown Prince Zhuangjing (莊敬太子 朱琳源; 1646－1646), first son
 Concubine, of the Shen clan (沈嫔)
 Concubine, of the Chen clan (陳嬪)

Ancestry

Zhu Yujian was the senior-most male-line descendants of Zhu Jing, Prince Ding of Tang, the 23rd son of Zhu Yuanzhang, after his father's death. Therefore, he was an eighth cousin of the Wanli Emperor. This chart only showed the latest actual title of the person(s).
 Zhu Yuanzhang, the Hongwu Emperor, 1328–1398
 Zhu Jing, Prince Ding of Tang, 1386–1415 (23rd son)
 Zhu Qiongda, Prince Xian of Tang, 1412–1475 (4th son & 2nd son as son by primary consort)
 Zhu Zhizhi, Prince Zhuang of Tang, 1432–1485 (2nd son)
 Zhu Miqian, Comm. Prince Gongjing of Wencheng, d.1516 (3rd son)
 Zhu Yuwen, Prince Jing of Tang, 1490–1560 
 Zhu Zhouyong, Prince Shun of Tang, 1538–1564
 Zhu Shuohuang, Prince Duan of Tang, d.1630
 Zhu Qisheng, the Hereditary Prince of Tang, d.1629 (1st son)
 Zhu Yujian, the Longwu Emperor, 1602–1646 (1st son)

Notes

References

Citations

Bibliography

Southern Ming emperors
1602 births
1646 deaths
Executed Ming dynasty people
Executed people from Henan
People executed by the Qing dynasty
People from Nanyang, Henan
17th-century Chinese monarchs
17th-century executions by China
Executed monarchs